Bigger Love is the seventh studio album by American singer-songwriter and musician John Legend. It was released on June 19, 2020, through Columbia Records. The album includes the singles "Conversations in the Dark", "Actions", "Bigger Love", and "Wild". The album won the Grammy Award for Best R&B Album at the 63rd Annual Grammy Awards. The album was further promoted by a limited North American tour leg that began on September 1, 2021, after several stops on the original US and UK tour itinerary were either postponed or canceled due to the COVID-19 pandemic.

Background
Bigger Love was written mostly in 2019. Recording for the album finished in February 2020. Legend stated he hoped the album would bring joy and be uplifting in light of the George Floyd protests that were taking place during the album's release. He released the cover art and track listing on June 12, a week before the release.

Artwork
The cover art was painted by artist Charly "Carlos" Palmer. The piece features a smiling portrait of the singer-songwriter covered in blooming flowers and a starry sky against a pop of turquoise backdrop.

Singles
Three singles were put out before the album was released. "Conversations in the Dark" was released on January 10, 2020. "Actions" was released on March 20. Legend performed "Actions" on The Tonight Show. The title track, "Bigger Love", was released on April 17, 2020. "Wild", a collaboration with American musician Gary Clark Jr., was released on August 13, 2020.

Critical reception

The album received generally mixed reviews from critics. Rolling Stone rated the album 3.5/5 stars, stating that the album's "self-aware" themes fit well with the current environment of the COVID-19 pandemic. Rated R&B recognized the album on its 30 Best R&B Albums of 2020 list, stating, "Bigger Love celebrates everlasting love as John Legend serenades with soothing falsettos, bold instrumentation, and groovy new sounds."

Track listing
All tracks, album credits, and metadata adapted from iTunes.

Notes
 signifies an additional producer
 signifies a co-producer
 signifies a vocal producer

Charts

References

2020 albums
John Legend albums
Columbia Records albums
Grammy Award for Best R&B Album
Albums produced by Mr Hudson
Albums produced by TMS (production team)